Highway 15 is a highway in the Canadian province of Saskatchewan. The Outlook Bridge carries Highway 15 across the South Saskatchewan River.

Major communities serviced by Highway 15 are Outlook and Melville. The highway parallels the main line of the Canadian National Railway between Nokomis and Melville.

In 2020, major repairs took place between highway 19 intersection and highway 11 near Kenaston.

Major Intersections 
From west to east:

References

015